Banks of Eden is the eleventh studio album by the progressive rock band The Flower Kings released on 18 June 2012. It is the first album with drummer Felix Lehrmann. The album reached #45 in the 2012 Top Heatseekers chart.

Track listing

Bonus disc

Extra material:

Personnel
 Roine Stolt - vocals, guitars
 Hasse Fröberg - vocals, guitars
 Jonas Reingold - vocals, bass guitar
 Tomas Bodin - organ, piano, mellotron and minimoogs
 Felix Lehrmann - drums

Charts

References

The Flower Kings albums
2012 albums
Inside Out Music albums